The Huseynia Mosque or the Tat Mosque ( Azerbaijani - Hüseyniyyə məscidi və ya Tatlar məscidi) is a historical and architectural monument of the 19th century located in the city of Ganja, Azerbaijan.

History 
Huseynia Mosque, a historical and architectural monument built in 1825 at the expense of the daughter of the Iranian prince Bahman Mirza - Sabiyya Khanum. Due to the fact that this mosque was also visited by believers, visitors from Iran, the local population began to call the Tat mosque. However, according to the existing kitaba, the mosque was originally called "Huseyniya". In the mosque above the mihrab, 3 kitabs have been preserved. One of them says:

“The foundation of this mosque was laid on the property and at the expense of Sabiya Khanum,

daughter of Prince Barman Mirza.

Other generous owners who live here have also invested in the construction of the building.”

Professor Sadig Shukurov writes in his book “Historical Monuments of Ganja”:

“The presence of decorations in the mosque and the size of the windows give the right to assert that the monument was originally built not as a mosque,

but as a madrasah , because in the Eastern world it was forbidden to decorate religious monuments with ornaments ".

However, this building was used as a mosque for a long time. As evidenced by one of the kitabe. The mehrab was added to the building later.

At the end of the 19th century, the Huseynia Mosque, in connection with the 100th anniversary of the birth of A.S. Pushkin, began to be used as a library. However, this did not last long and the mosque began to function again. In 1920, the activities of the library were restored under the name "Nizami-Pushkin". People's artist Togrul Narimanbekov created an example of paintings of two great poets on the inner wall of the building on the eve of the anniversary of Nizami. At present, the library bears the name of the Azerbaijani poet Nizami Ganjavi. Library No. 19 named after Nizami Ganjavi has about 10,000 books.

References

Monuments and memorials in Azerbaijan
Mosques in Azerbaijan